Orville is a masculine given name. Notable people with the name include:

Orville E. Babcock (1835–1884), American general
Orville Hickman Browning (1806–1881), American politician
Orville Bulman (1904-1978), American businessman-turned-painter
Orville Carlisle (1917–1988), American inventor
Orville Lloyd Douglas (born 1976), Canadian poet and writer
Orville Willis Forte IV (born 1970), American actor and writer
Orville Freeman (1918–2003), American politician 
Orville Frenette (born 1927), Canadian judge
Orville Gibson (1856–1918), American guitar maker
Orville Harrold (1878–1933), American singer
Orville L. Hubbard (1903–1982), American politician
Orville Johnson (born 1953), American musician
Orville R. Leonard (1834–1894), Justice of the Supreme Court of Nevada
Orville Moody (1933–2008), American golfer
Orville Howard Phillips (1924–2009), Canadian politician
Orville H. Platt (1827–1905), American politician
Orville C. Pratt (1819–1891), American lawyer and judge
Orville Redenbacher (1907–1995), American businessman
Orville Wayne Rollins (1912–1991), American businessman, co-founder of Rollins, Inc.
Orville Schell (born 1940), American writer
Orville Taylor (born 1970), Jamaican athlete
Orville Trask (born 1934), American football player
Orville Turnquest (born 1929), Bahamian politician
Orville Vogel (1907–1991), American scientist
Orville Wright (1871–1948), American inventor and aviator
Orville Peck (born ?), Canadian country singer

Fictional characters
Orville "Rick" Wright, in the television series Magnum, P.I.
Orville the Duck, a puppet operated by ventriloquist Keith Harris
Orville the albatross, in the 1977 Disney film The Rescuers
Orville, a ghost in the 2001 video game Luigi's Mansion
 Orville Simpson, grandfather of Homer Simpson in The Simpsons TV show
 Don Orville, a fictional character in the NBC sitcom 3rd Rock from the Sun
 Lord Orville, a fictional earl in the 1778 novel Evelina by Frances Burney
”Uncle” Orville, extended member of the family that is central to the attraction “Carousel of Progress”
 Orville, Wilbur's older brother and a receptionist for Dodo Airlines in Animal Crossing: New Horizons

Masculine given names
English masculine given names